Hristina Tancheva Georgieva (born 3 January 1972 in Sofia) is a female javelin thrower from Bulgaria. Her personal best throw is 63.32 metres, achieved in June 2000 in Athens.

Achievements

References

 
 sports-reference

1972 births
Living people
Bulgarian female javelin throwers
Athletes (track and field) at the 2000 Summer Olympics
Athletes (track and field) at the 2004 Summer Olympics
Olympic athletes of Bulgaria
Sportspeople from Sofia